This is a list of electors (members of the Electoral College) who cast ballots to elect the President of the United States and Vice President of the United States in the 2000 presidential election. There are 538 electors from the 50 states and the District of Columbia. While every state except Nebraska and Maine chooses the electors by statewide vote, many states require that one elector be designated for each congressional district. Except where otherwise noted, such designations refer to the elector's residence in that district rather than election by the voters of the district.

Alabama

Glen Dunlap
Bob Fincher
Homer Jackson
Jerry Lathan
Elaine Little
Melba Peters
Martha Stokes
Jean Sullivan
Edgar Welden

Alaska

Bill J. Allen
Susan Fischetti
Lucy Groh

Arizona

Joe Arpaio
Linda Barber
Dennis Booth
Webb Crockett
Paul Robert Fannin
LaVelle McCoy
Susan D. Minnaugh
Frank Straka

Arkansas

Pat Dodge
Bud Cummins
Mildred Homan
Betsy Thompson
Jim Hendren
Sarah Agee

California

Sunil Aghi
Amy Arambula
Rachel Binah
R. Stephen Bollinger
Roberts Braden
Laura Karolina Capps
Anni Chung
Joseph A. Cislowski
Sheldon Cohn
Thor Emblem
Elsa Favila
John Freidenrich
Cecelia Fuentes
Glen Fuller
James Garrison
Sally Goehring
Florence Gold
Jill S. Hardy
Therese Horsting
Georgie Huff
Robert Eugene Hurd
Harriet A. Ingram
Robert Jordan
John Koza
John Laird
N. Mark Lam
Manuel M. Lopez
Henry Lozano
David Mann
Beverly Martin
R. Keith McDonald
Carol D. Norberg
Ron Oberndorfer
Gerard Orozco
Trudy Owens
Gregory S. Pettis
Flo Rene Pickett
Theodore H. Plant
Art Pulaski
Eloise Reyes
Alex Arthur Reza
C. Craig Roberts
Jason Rodríguez
Luis D. Rojas
Howard L. Schock
Lane Sherman
David A. Torres
Larry Trullinger
Angelo Tsakopoulos
Richard Valle
Karen Waters
Don Wilcox
William K. Wong
Rosalind Wyman

Colorado

Bob Beauprez
Marcy Benson
Robert Dieter
Mary Hergert
Robert Martinez
Ralph Nagel
Lilly Nunez
Joe Rogers

Connecticut

Nick Balletto
Frank Cirillo
Marilyn Cohen
Gloria Collins
Kimberly Ford
Thomas McDonough
Ken Slapin
Clorinda Soldevila

Delaware

Michael A. Begatto
Margaret Rose Henry
Ruth Ann Messick

District of Columbia

William Simons
Nadine P. Winter
Barbara Lett-Simmons (faithless elector)

Florida

Alred S. Austin
Deborah L. Brooks
Armando Codina
Maria De La Milera
Sandra M. Faulkner
Thomas C. Feeney III
Feliciano M. Foyo
Jeanne Barber Godwin
Dawn Guzzetta
Cynthia M. Handley
Adam W. Herbert
Al Hoffman
Glenda E. Hood
Carole Jean Jordan
Charles W. Kane
Mel Martinez
John M. McKay
Dorsey C. Miller
Berta J. Moralejo
H. Gary Morse
Marsha Nippert
Darryl K. Sharpton
Tom Slade
John Thrasher
Robert L. Woody

Georgia

Anna R. Cablik
Teresa Jeter Chappell
Charles Commander Clay
Fred Cooper
James C. Edenfield
Winnie C. LeClercq
Brenda R. (B.J.) Lopez
Carolyn Dodgen Meadows
Alec Poitevint
Eric Tanenblatt
Cynthia Teasley
Virgil R. Williams
Bob Young

Hawaii

Michael Amii
Marsha Joyner
Joy Kobashigawa Lewis
Pedro Racelis Jr.

Idaho

Phil Batt
Connie Hansen
James McClure
Orriette Sinclair

Illinois

Joan Brennan
Dave Bybee, Vilma Colom
Barbara Flynn Currie
John P. Daley
Vera Davis
James DeLeo
Marge Friedman
Charles A. Hartke
Kathryn 'Tinker' Harvey
Carolyn Brown Hodge
Constance A. Howard
Mary Lou Kearns
Michael J. Madigan
William Marovitz
Shirley McCombs
Molly McKenzie
Victory McNamara
John Nelson
Donald Pedro
Daniel M. Pierce
Jerry Sinclair

Indiana

Rodric D. Bray
Roger A. Chiabai
Beverly Gard
Don Heckard
Marla Irving
Virginia Lee
P.E. MacAllister
Barbara L. McClellan
Michael D. McDaniel
Max Middendorf
Michael Miner
Virgil Scheidt

Iowa

Jeff Heland
Angelyn King
Paulee Lipsman
Emil Pavich
John O'Brien
Ernest Ricehill
David Tingwald

Kansas

Shari Caywood
Gene Eastin
Richard Eckert
Susan Estes
Mark Heitz
Charles Hostetler

Kentucky

George S. Beard
William S. Farish Jr.
Robert B. Fearing
Connie S. Hayes
G. Richard Noss Jr.
A. Douglas Reece
Michael A. Shea
Larry Joe Walden

Louisiana

Patricia Brister
Donald Ensenat
Heulette Fontenot Jr.
Mike Foster
Steve Jordan
Elizabeth Levy
Al Lippman
Suzanne Haik Terrell
Michael Woods Sr.

Maine

Joseph Mayo (District 1)
William Phillips (District 2)
Christopher Babbidge (At-Large)
Dorothy Melanson (At-Large)

Maryland

Clarence W. Blount
Gene W. Counihan
Howard Friedman
Mary Ann E. Love
Thomas V. Mike Miller
Mary Butler Murphy
Mary Jo Neville
Gregory Pecoraro
Ina Taylor
Beatrice P. Tignor

Massachusetts

Patrica Armstrong
Russell A. Ashton
George C. Barnoski
Robert E. Colt
Stephen Patrick Driscoll
John M. Flynn
Roberta Goldman
Etta B. Goodstein
Frederick R. Koed
Margaret MacKenzie
Carolyne DeVore Parks
Marcia L. Sweeney

Michigan

Lana Boldi
John D. Cherry
Patty Fedewa
Sigrid L. Grace
Dona Jean Graham
Freman Hendrix
Jeff Jenks
John Kelly
Don Oetman
Ken Oke
Charles Prather
Jim Ramey
Iris K. Salters
Judith L. Strong
David P. Taylor
Juli Trudell
Mary Warner
Marie Weigold

Minnesota

Carol Bartels
Prudy Cameron
Joan Campbell
Elmer Deutschmann
Elizabeth Kalisch
Matthew Little
Glenda Meixell
John Meuers
Janis Ray
Georgiana Ruzich

Mississippi

Bob Anthony
Miki Cassidy
Thomas Colbert
Delbert Hosemann
Ellen Reineke
John Junkin
Kent Nicaud
Winona LaDuke

Missouri

David Barklage
Bruce Bredeman
Marc Ellinger
Gordon Elliott
John Hancock
Stan Horacek
Homer Johnson
John Judd
Michael Korte
Dennis Owens
Al Rotskoff

Montana

Thelma Baker
Jack Galt
Tillie Pierce

Nebraska

Mary Johnson (District 1)
Lee Terry, Sr. (District 2)
Howard Lamb (District 3)
Mildred Curtis
John Y. McCollister (At-Large)

Nevada

Jane Ham
Trudy Hushbeck
William Raggio
Tom Wiesner

New Hampshire

Stephen Duprey
Wayne MacDonald
Augusta Petrone
Alida Weergang

New Jersey

Paul M. Bangiola
Angelo R. Bianchi
Mamie Bridgeforth
Dennis P. Collins
John Garrett
Deborah Lynch
Patricia McCullough
John P. McGreevey
June B. Montag
W. Michael Murphy
Jeffrey L. Nash
Barbara A. Plumeri
Julia Valdivia
Stephen S. Weinstein
Charles Wowkanech

New Mexico

Tom Atcitty
Rick Blea
Diane D. Denish
Jeep Gilliland
Mary Gail Gwaltney

New York

Susan I. Abramowitz
Leslie Alpert
Martin S. Begun
David L. Cohen
Carolee A. Conklin
Martin Connor
Lorraine Cortez Vasquez
Inez Dickens
Cynthia Emmer
Herman D. Farrell Jr.
Emily Giske
Patrick G. Halpin
Raymond B. Harding
Judith Hope
Denis M. Hughes
Virginia Kee
Bertha Lewis
Alberta Madonna
Thomas J. Manton
Deborah Marciano
Helen Marshall
Carl McCall
Elizabeth F. Momrow
Clarence Norman Jr.
Daniel F. Donohue
Shirley O'Connell
G. Steven Pigeon
Roberto Ramirez
Michael Schell
Sheldon Silver
Andrew Spano
Eliot Spitzer
Randi Weingarten

North Carolina

Fran Barnhart
Claude Billings
Sam Currin
Tom Dwiggins
A. Dial Gray
Barbara Holt
Marshall Hurley
Margaret King
Jeff Mixon
Joe L. Morgan
Steve Rader
Robert Rector
Dewitt Rhoades
Linda Young

North Dakota

Rosemarie Myrdal
Edward T. Schafer
Bryce Streibel

Ohio

Alex R. Arshinkoff
Alan P. Bedol
Robert T. Bennett
Deborah Burstion-Donbraye
John J. Chester
John D. Chiappetta
Leanna Coil
Jo Ann Davidson
Danny D. Hamilton
Donna J. Harter
Pat Hennessey
Paul M. Hoag
John H. McConnell
Doug Miller
Pakkiri Rajagopal
Mercer Reynolds
Pauline S. Riel
Shirley Sadler
Donald G. Simmons
Clarence R. Smith
W.R Timken Jr.

Oklahoma

Steve Byas
James Cruson
Paul Hollrah
Kristal Markowitz
Bob McDowell
Donald O'Nesky
Tom Prince
George Wiland|George W. Wiland

Oregon

Barbara Davidson
Jim Edmunson
Moshe Lenske
Dorothy MacKay
Louise Poteet
Maria Smithson
Judy Sugnet

Pennsylvania

Kathy Black
Richard W. Bloomingdale
Robert P. Casey Jr.
H. William DeWeese
Nelson Diaz
William M. George
Ken Jarin
James J. Johnston
Edward Keller
Robert Mellow
Tom Murphy
Robert O'Connor
Lazar M. Palnick
Stephen R. Reed
T. J. Rooney
Joyce Savocchio
John F. Street
Patsy J. Tallarico
Christine M. Tartaglione
Margaret M. Tartaglione
Marian Tasco
Sala Udin
Anna Verna

Rhode Island

Joyce E. Caprio
Donald R. Sweitzer
Mark S. Weiner
Susan Weiner

South Carolina

Cynthia F. Costa
Danny R. Faulkner
Thomas H. McLean
William B. Prince
Dan Richardson
Douglas L. Wavle
Cecil F. Windham Sr.
Buddy Witherspoon

South Dakota

Carole Hillard
William J. Janklow
Joel Rosenthal

Tennessee

Lamar Alexander
Daniel Dirksen Baker
Lana Bowman Ball
Nancy Cunningham
Winfield Dunn
Jimmy Exum
Jim Henry
Raja Jubran
Anie Kent
Patti Saliba
Mamon Wright

Texas

Ernie Angelo
James R. Batsell
Carmen P. Castillo
Mary Ceverha
Ken Clark
Hally B. Clements
Mary E. Cowart
Sue Daniel
Michael Dugas
Betty R. Hines
Jim Hamlin
Cruz G. Hernandez
Chuck Jones
William Earl Juett
Neal J. Katz
Betsy Lake
Adair Margo
Loyce McCarter
Joseph I. Oniell III
Michael Paddie
Nancy Palm
Howard Pebley Jr.
Robert J. Peden
Helen Quiram
James B. Randall
Clyde Moody Siebman
Stan Stanart
Henry W. Teich Jr.
Randal Tye Thomas
James Davidson Walker
Tom F. Ward Jr.
Gayle West

Utah

Lewis Billings
Arlene Ellis
Ron Fox
Michael O. Leavitt
Olene S. Walker

Vermont

Violet Coffin
A. Jeffry Taylor
Alan Weiss

Virginia

Parker J. Bena
Vincent F. Callahan Jr.
Patsy W. Drain
Gloria Taylor Fisher
Ann H. Garrett
Philip J. Infantino III
Edith M. Light
Luther E. 'Ikey' Miller
Frances M. Sadler
George William Thomas Jr.
H. Evans Thomas V
Gary E. Waddell
Peyton Anthony White

Washington

Debbie Aldrich
Vic Battson
Charlotte Coker
Jim Frush
Tim Hattenburg
Rachel Lake
Nancy McGinnis
Carol Sue Perkins
Debbie Regala
Carl Schwartz
Paul Steinberg

West Virginia

James H. Harless
John H. McCutcheon II
Jo Slaughter
Charles S. Trump IV
Flip West

Wisconsin

Alice Clausing
Pedro Colon
Paulette Copeland
Reynolds Honold
Joan Kaeding
Mark McQuate
Ruth Miner-Kessel
Christine Sinicki
Tim Sullivan
Angela Sutkiewicz
Charlie Wolden

Wyoming

Judy Catchpole
Gale Geringer
John Patton

References
 https://web.archive.org/web/20120212174238/http://presidentelect.org/e2000.html

United States presidential electors

2000
George W. Bush-related lists